Crime in the Cayman Islands has remained low since first being recorded. The British territory is known for being one of the safest in the Caribbean, however, since March 2022, there has been an increase in gun violence which has prompted the Premier of the Cayman Islands, Wayne Panton to reassure the public that the situation is being tackled.

People are advised to take caution in areas where crime is known to occur, such as downtown George Town and parts of West Bay. It is rare to be the victim of a serious crime, but pickpocketing and having items stolen is possible.

In 2010, the homicide rate in the Cayman Islands was 15.88 per 100,000 people. It decreased to 8.22 per 100,000 people in 2014.

Recent reports
A 2021 report released by the Royal Cayman Islands Police Service revealed crime in the Cayman Islands rose by 3.9%. Gun-related crime rose by 88%, and gun crime with the intent to use rose by 90%. Sexual offenses rose by 10%, and domestic violence decreased 13%. There were also 34,093 reported incidents to the police that same year.

2022 Crime wave
Since March 2022, there has been an unprecedented increase in gun violence across many areas of the Cayman Islands, with growing fears among the public and questions rising about whether Cayman’s “crime free” reputation has ended.

Since the beginning of 2022, armed robberies and gun-related murders have increased, prompting the Royal Cayman Islands Police Service to heighten its patrol. Situations escalated as two homicides occurred within days of each other in the last week of April 2022. This triggered a special operation by the Tactical Firearms Unit which conducted a search of a vehicle near Seven Mile Beach. Two suspects from the vehicle fled on foot to the beach and gunshots were heard by those nearby in condos and hotels. This came as a shock to many as the Seven Mile Beach strip, a hub for tourists, is usually an area of Cayman where crime rarely spills over into.

References

Cayman